Captain Timothy Dwight (1629–1718) represented Dedham in the Great and General Court of Massachusetts and was the progenitor of the Dwight family.

Personal life
Dwight was born in England in 1629 to John and Hannah Dwight and was brought to Dedham, Massachusetts in 1635 as a child. John Dwight was one of the first settlers of Dedham. Timothy was made a freeman in 1655 and was a member of the First Church and Parish in Dedham beginning in 1652.

Dwight was married six times. The first time was on November 11, 1651, to Sarah Perman, who died in childbirth on May 29, 1652. On May 3, 1653, he married Sarah Powell, who died on June 27, 1664; she gave him four children. Anna Flynt, his third wife on January 9, 1664 – 1665, gave him 10 children, including Josiah Dwight.

His fourth wife, the widow Mary Endwind of Reading, Massachusetts, married him on January 7, 1686 – 1687 and died August 30, 1688, without any children.  Esther Fisher became his fifth wife on July 31, 1690, and died on January 30, 1690 – 1691. Bethia Morse, his final wife, married him on February 1, 1691 – 1692 and died on February 6, 1717 – 1718. He had 14 children.

Military and public service
Dwight served in the Great and General Court from 1691 to 1692 and perhaps later. He also served for 10 years as Town Clerk and 25 years as selectman. His public service was praised by Rev. Samuel Dexter, who called him "a man of renown."

Dwight, with Richard Ellis, served as the agent of the Town when negotiating with King Phillip for title to the land today known as Wrentham, Massachusetts in 1660. He was also town clerk for a total of 10 years, having first been elected in 1661. He served 24 terms as selectman, beginning in 1644.

He was a cornet of a cavalry troop as a young man and later served as a captain of foot soldiers.  He fought against the native peoples in the area ten times, and either killed or took prisoner nine.

Death
Dwight built the first tomb in the Old Village Cemetery around 1700. In that tomb are laid his body, Eleazer Lusher, William Adams. He died on January 31, 1718, and was buried on February 7, 1718, the same day as his wife, Bethia, who died the day before. His pallbearers included Governor Joseph Dudley and Judge Samuel Sewall.

Notes

References

Works cited

Dedham, Massachusetts selectmen
1718 deaths
1629 births
Kingdom of England emigrants to Massachusetts Bay Colony
Military personnel from Dedham, Massachusetts
Burials at Old Village Cemetery
Dedham Town Clerks
Members of the colonial Massachusetts General Court from Dedham
Signers of the Dedham Covenant